Llangybi railway station may refer to:

 Llangybi railway station (Ceredigion), on the Carmarthen—Aberystwyth line in mid Wales
 Llangybi railway station (Gwynedd), on the Carnarvonshire Railway in north Wales